In computing, 10-foot user interface, 10-foot UI or 3-meter user interface is a graphical user interface designed for televisions. Additionally, the limitations of a television's remote control necessitate extra user experience considerations to minimize user effort.

In the past, these types of human interaction design (HID) interfaces are driven by remote controllers primarily using infrared (IR) codes signals, which are increasingly replaced by other two-way radio-frequency protocol standards such as Bluetooth, while maintaining the use of IR for certain wake-up situations. The voice interfaces are also now purposed to provide a near-field experience in addition to the far-field experience of the likes of smart speakers. One of the requirements of voice-input 10-foot user interface usually require a device like smart speaker, over-the-top (OTT) TV box or smart television with Internet connectivity supported by an advanced software operating system.

Design
The term "10-foot" or "3-meter" is used to differentiate this user interface style from those used on desktop computers, which typically assume the user's eyes are only about two feet (24 inches, 60 cm) from the display. This difference in distance from the display has a huge impact on the interface design, requiring the use of extra large fonts on a television and allowing relatively few items to be shown on a television at once.

A 10-foot UI is almost always designed to be operated by a simple hand-held remote control. Rather than the mouse or touchscreen which are commonly used with other types of user interfaces, the remote's directional pad is the primary means of navigation. This means that a 10-foot UI needs to arrange items on screen in a way that clearly shows which item would be next in each of the four directions of the directional pad – usually a grid layout. Also, without a mouse cursor, the currently-selected item must be highlighted in some way.

Ten-foot interfaces may resemble other post-WIMP systems graphically, but do not assume the use of a touch screen.

The goal of 10-foot user interface design is normally to make the user's interaction as simple and efficient as possible, trying to achieve a more laid-back and relaxed user experience with as few button presses as possible while still having an intuitive layout, in terms of accomplishing user goals—what is often called user-centered design. Good user interface design facilitates finishing the task at hand without drawing unnecessary attention to itself. Graphic design may be utilized to support its usability; however, the design process must balance technical functionality and visual elements (e.g., mental model) to create a system that is not only operational but also usable and adaptable to changing user needs.

One of the additional feature in 10-foot user interface design is also to repurpose the on screen display (OSD) for providing a clear menu-driven interaction for users. This complements the navigation available in most handheld remote controllers. The rise of the use of voice-based input (as found in some remote controllers and smart speakers) also provides a direct control interface enhancing the user experience.

See also
 Human–computer interaction
 Icon design
 Smart TV
 User experience design

References

External links

Graphical user interfaces
Human–computer interaction
Interactive television
Multimodal interaction
Television terminology